Dr Henry Burton  (27 February 1799 – 10 August 1849) was a British physician and chemist, who is famous for his identification of blue discolouration of the gums, the eponymous Burton line, as a symptom of lead poisoning.

Family
Henry Burton was a son of the London property developer James Burton and his wife Elizabeth Westley (1761 – 1837). Henry was a brother of the gunpowder manufacturer William Ford Burton, the architect Decimus Burton, and the Egyptologist, James Burton.

As the Cambridge Alumni Database identifies, some sources, including the entry for Henry Burton in the Royal College of Physicians’s Lives of the Fellows, incorrectly state that Henry Burton was the son of one ‘John Burton’. This is incorrect: he was the son of the aforementioned James Burton.

On his father's side, his great-great grandparents were Rev. James Haliburton (1681–1756) and Margaret Eliott, daughter of Sir William Eliott, 2nd Baronet and aunt of George Augustus Eliott, 1st Baron Heathfield. Henry was descended from John Haliburton (1573–1627), from whom Sir Walter Scott, 1st Baronet could trace his descent on the maternal side. He was a cousin of the Tory MP Thomas Chandler Haliburton, and of the civil servant Arthur Lawrence Haliburton, 1st Baron Haliburton.

Career

He went to sea on the 98-gun HMS Boyne before resigning from the Navy and entering the Gunpowder Office. In September 1825, he became Professor of Chemistry at St Thomas' Hospital, where he subsequently became Senior Physician. He was appointed Censor of the Royal College of Physicians in 1838 and later was appointed Consiliarius He is famous for his discovery that a blue line on the gums, the eponymous Burton line, is a symptom of lead poisoning.

Marriage
Henry Burton married Mary Elizabeth, eldest daughter of William Poulton of Maidenhead, at St. George's, Bloomsbury, in 1826. She died in 1829, without issue, and Henry did not remarry. Henry lived at 41 Jermyn Street, London, and 58 Marina, St. Leonard's-on-Sea.

References 

19th-century English medical doctors
1799 births
1849 deaths
People educated at Tonbridge School
Alumni of Gonville and Caius College, Cambridge